Allomyces catenoides is a species of fungi in the family Blastocladiaceae. It was described by Frederick Kroeber Sparrow in 1964.

References

Fungi described in 1964
Blastocladiomycota